The Sticky River is a  river that flows into the southern end of Sebago Lake in Standish, Maine.

References

Standish, Maine
Rivers of Cumberland County, Maine
Rivers of Maine